Totò lascia o raddoppia? ("Totò double or nothing?") is a 1956 Italian comedy film directed by Camillo Mastrocinque.

Plot 
The Duke Gagliardo della Forcoletta decides to participate in the television quiz Lascia o raddoppia? in order to buy a bar for his daughter.

Cast 

 Totò: Duke Gagliardo della Forcoletta
 Dorian Gray: Hélène 
 Mike Bongiorno: Himself
 Valeria Moriconi: Elsa Marini 
 Carlo Croccolo: Camillo 
 Rosanna Schiaffino: Colomba 
 Bruce Cabot: Nick Molise 
 Gabriele Tinti: Bruno Palmieri 
 Luigi Pavese: Anastasio 
 Elio Pandolfi: Osvaldo 
 Rocco D'Assunta: Joe Taccola  
 Edy Campagnoli: Herself
Vincent Barbi : Molise's henchman

References

External links

1956 films
1956 comedy films
Films directed by Camillo Mastrocinque
Italian comedy films
Films about television
Films set in Milan
1950s Italian films
Italian black-and-white films